Zalipais is a genus of minute sea snails or micromollusks, marine gastropod molluscs in the family Skeneidae.

Species
Species within the genus Zalipais include:
 Zalipais benthicola Powell, 1927
 Zalipais bruniense Beddome, 1883 
 Zalipais inscripta (Tate, R., 1899)
 Zalipais lissa (Suter, 1908)
 Zalipais parva Finlay, 1924
 Zalipais turneri Powell, 1939
Species brought into synonymy
 Zalipais laseroni Kershaw, 1955: synonym of  Zalipais inscripta (Tate, R., 1899)

References

 Iredale, 1915, Transactions of the New Zealand Institute, 47: 442, 444
 Powell A. W. B., New Zealand Mollusca, William Collins Publishers Ltd, Auckland, New Zealand 1979 

 
Skeneidae
Extant Zanclean first appearances
Gastropod genera